Gliese 393, or GJ 393, is a single star in the equatorial constellation of Sextans, positioned about 1.5° to the NNW of Beta Sextantis. At an apparent visual magnitude of 9.65, it is much too faint to be seen with the unaided eye. This star is located at a distance of 22.9 light years from the Sun based on parallax, and is drifting further away with a radial velocity of +8.3 km/s. The net velocity of this star relative to the Sun is 32.9 km/s. It shares a similar space motion as members of the AB Doradus moving group, but is considered a random interloper.

The stellar classification of GJ 393 is M2V, indicating this is a small red dwarf star that is generating energy through core hydrogen fusion. It is rotating slowly and appears to be chromospherically inactive, suggesting it is an older star; perhaps as much as 10 billion years old. The star has 43% of the mass of the Sun and 44.6% of the Sun's radius. The metallicity, what astronomers term the abundance of heavy elements, is lower than in the Sun. It is radiating just 2.7% of the Sun's luminosity from its photosphere at an effective temperature of 3,579 K.

Planetary system

In 2019, one candidate planet was detected by the radial velocity method. Longer period signals found in the data were interpreted as stellar activity.

In 2021, the planet was confirmed as real after being detected independently in three different datasets.

References

M-type main-sequence stars
Planetary systems with one confirmed planet
Sextans (constellation)
0393
051317
J10285555+0050275
BD=+01 2447